Kroaldakhn is a village in Hazm Al Udayn District in the Ibb Governorate in Yemen.
According to the census that was done by the government in Yemen in 2004, the village has a population of 28 residents.

References 

Populated places in Ibb Governorate